Jennifer Mary Bornholdt  (born 1 November 1960) is a New Zealand poet and anthologist.

Biography
Born in Lower Hutt, Bornholdt received a bachelor's degree in English Literature and a Diploma in Journalism. She studied poetry with Bill Manhire at Victoria University of Wellington in 1984.

She is co-editor of My Heart Goes Swimming: New Zealand Love Poems and the Oxford Anthology of New Zealand Poetry in English, which won the Montana New Zealand Book Award for Poetry in 1997. In addition, Bornholdt won the 2002 Meridian Energy Katherine Mansfield Memorial Fellowship, was a recipient of one of the 2003 Arts Foundation of New Zealand Laureate Awards, and was named the fifth Te Mata Estate New Zealand Poet Laureate in 2005. Her poems were selected for the Best New Zealand Poems series in 2001, 2002, 2003 and 2005.

In the 2014 New Year Honours, Bornholdt was appointed a Member of the New Zealand Order of Merit, for services as a poet.

Books

Poetry
Bornholdt's poetry has been published in a number of volumes:
 1988: This Big Face
 1989: Moving House
 1991: Waiting Shelter
 1995: How We Met
 1997: Miss New Zealand: Selected Poems
 2000: These Days
 2003: Summer

Children's books
2013: A Book is A Book
2017: The Longest Breakfast

Editor
 Co-editor, with Gregory O'Brien, My Heart Goes Swimming: New Zealand Love Poems, Random House New Zealand (2000) , 
 Co-editor Oxford Anthology of New Zealand Poetry in English

References

External links
 New Zealand Electronic Poetry Centre
 New Zealand Book Council
 Author profile

1960 births
Living people
New Zealand poets
New Zealand women poets
New Zealand Poets Laureate
People from Lower Hutt
Victoria University of Wellington alumni
Women anthologists
Members of the New Zealand Order of Merit